"Raining on the Rock" is a song written and performed by Australian singer-songwriter John Williamson. The title is in reference to Uluru with references in the song to Albert Namatjira and Kata Tjuta (The Olgas). The song was released in January 1987 as the second single from Williamson's sixth studio album Mallee Boy.  

In 2011, Williamson was asked which song is he most proud of and he said ""Raining on the Rock". I'm not necessarily the most proud of it but it's a song that probably means a lot to me because it's about the heart of the country and I think the rock represents that. The ancient nature of the country that was here before any of us is the one thing that can draw us all together, putting religion, politics and race aside."

In 2014, Chris Johnston from Sydney Morning Herald called "Raining on the Rock" one of the best songs on John Williamson's best albums. It's also been references as an unofficial Australian anthem.

Track listing

1998 version

In 1998, Williamson re-recorded "Raining on the Rock" with Warren H Williams, for Williams' second studio album Country Friends and Me.

At the ARIA Music Awards of 1998, Williamson and Williams performed the song. The song was nominated for ARIA Award for Best Indigenous Release The song was nominated for vocal collaboration of the year at the 1999 Country Music Awards of Australia, where the duo again performed the track in front of 6,000 fans where they received a standing ovation.

At the 1998 National Indigenous Music Awards, the song won Single Release of the Year.

Release history

Other versions
 In 2007, Felicity Urquhart covered the song on the album, The Great Australian Songbook Volume 2
 In 2011, The Wayfarers covered the song on their album Waltzing Matilda
 In 2013 Neil Ward covered the song on his album,Raining on the Rock - 18 Aussie Bush Folk Ballads

References

1986 songs
1987 singles
1998 singles
John Williamson (singer) songs
Australian folk songs
Australian patriotic songs
Festival Records singles